Pure Hank is the forty-third studio album by American musician Hank Williams Jr. It was released by Warner Bros./Curb Records in April 1991. "If It Will, It Will" and "Angels Are Hard to Find" were released as singles with the former becoming Williams' final top 40 country single, peaking at #26, until the release of "I'm One of You" in 2003. The album peaked at number 8 on the Billboard Top Country Albums chart and has been certified Gold by the RIAA.

"Angels Are Hard to Find" is a re-recording of a song Hank had released on his 1974 album, Living Proof.  This album's version was featured in the 2013 film Gravity.  "(I've Got My) Future on Ice" is a Jimmy Martin cover. "Just to Satisfy You" is a cover of a Waylon Jennings song that Waylon released twice in the 1960s and recorded as a #1 duet with Willie Nelson in 1982. "Simple Man" is a cover of Lynyrd Skynyrd's 1973 classic from their debut album.

Track listing

Personnel

 Eddie Bayers – drums
 Michael Black – background vocals
 Kathy Burdick – background vocals
 Cami Elen – background vocals
 Paul Franklin – dobro
 Rob Hajacos – fiddle
 Mike Haynes – trumpet
 Mike Henderson – slide guitar
 Bobby Hicks – fiddle
 Jim Horn – flute, baritone saxophone
 Byron House – programming
 Dann Huff – electric guitar
 Mike Lawler – synthesizer
 Bernie Leadon – mandolin
 "Cowboy" Eddie Long – steel guitar
 Yvette Marine – background vocals
 Carl Marsh – programming
 Terry McMillan – harmonica
 Kim Morrison – background vocals
 Jonell Mosser – background vocals
 Don Potter – acoustic guitar
 Michael Rhodes – bass guitar
 Matt Rollings – keyboards
 Charles Rose – trombone
 David Schnaufer – culca, dulcimer
 Denis Solee – tenor saxophone
 Julie Stevens – background vocals
 Harry Stinson – background vocals
 Wayne Turner – electric guitar
 Hank Williams Jr. – lead vocals
 Dennis Wilson – background vocals
 Curtis Young – background vocals
 Reggie Young – electric guitar

Chart performance

References

1991 albums
Hank Williams Jr. albums
Warner Records albums
Curb Records albums
Albums produced by Barry Beckett
Albums produced by Jim Ed Norman